Jodhi Tania May (née Hakim-Edwards; 8 May 1975) is a British actress. She remains the youngest recipient of the Best Actress award at the Cannes Film Festival, for A World Apart (1988). Her other film appearances include The Last of the Mohicans (1992), Sister My Sister (1994), and A Quiet Passion (2016).

Early life
May was born Jodhi Tania Hakim-Edwards in 1975 in Camden Town, London. Her name was later legally changed to Jodhi Tania May.

Her mother, Jocelyn Hakim, is an art teacher of French-Turkish descent who as a student arranged to marry artist-designer Malcolm McLaren to obtain citizenship, paying him £50 to marry her in a Lewisham register office in 1972.  They later divorced, a move that cost McLaren's grandmother £2,000. May has not publicly identified her father, besides stating he is German.  She was educated at Camden School for Girls.

May first acted at the age of 12 for A World Apart (1988). For the role she received a Best Actress award at the 1988 Cannes Film Festival, shared with her co-stars Barbara Hershey and Linda Mvusi.

Other than a brief lull while studying English at Wadham College, Oxford, she has had near constant work since her debut, and can regularly be seen on film, television and the British stage.

Career

Notable roles have included Alice Munro in Michael Mann's The Last of the Mohicans, Lea Papin in Sister My Sister, Lady Sarah Lennox in Aristocrats, Florence Banner in Tipping the Velvet, Anne Boleyn in the first adaptation of The Other Boleyn Girl, and Sabina Spielrein in the play The Talking Cure. In 2002, May wrote and directed a short film called Spyhole.

In August 2005, May appeared in Blackbird by David Harrower alongside Roger Allam at the Edinburgh Festival in a production by German director Peter Stein. The play transferred to the Albery Theatre, London in February 2006 and won a best new play award.

In 2010, she played the lead role of Kay in Mark Haddon's play Polar Bears at the Donmar Warehouse.

May played Janet Stone in the 2011 noir thriller I, Anna, alongside Gabriel Byrne, Charlotte Rampling, Eddie Marsan, and Honor Blackman.

In 2015, she appeared in the Season 5 premiere of the HBO series Game of Thrones.

In 2019, she played Queen Calanthe in The Witcher, Netflix's live-action adaptation of Andrzej Sapkowski's popular book series.

In 2020, alongside Valentina Cervi, Francesco Scianna, Filippo Timi, she was in the cast of Marco Simon Puccioni's film The Invisible Thread, produced by Netflix and likely to be released in 2022.

Filmography

References

External links
 

1975 births
Living people
Alumni of Wadham College, Oxford
Cannes Film Festival Award for Best Actress winners
English child actresses
English film actresses
English radio actresses
English stage actresses
English television actresses
English voice actresses
English people of German descent
English people of French descent
People from Camden Town
People educated at Camden School for Girls
20th-century English actresses
21st-century English actresses
English people of Turkish descent
Actresses from London